Hiram Cronk (April 19, 1800 – May 13, 1905) was the last surviving veteran of the War of 1812 at the time of his death. He lived to the age of 105.

Life and career
Born in Frankfort, New York, Cronk enlisted with his father and two brothers on August 14, 1814. He served with the New York Volunteers in the defense of Sackett's Harbor and was discharged November 16, 1814. For his service, he received a pension of $12 per month. In 1903, the United States Congress increased it to $25 per month. He also received a special pension of $72 per month from the State of New York.

Cronk spent most of his life working as a shoemaker. He married Mary Thornton in 1825, with whom he had seven children. At the time of his death, he had 14 grandchildren and eight great-grandchildren. (His great-granddaughter Jane lived to over 100 years of age, making the two "serial centenarians").

Cronk died in Ava, New York in May 1905 at the age of 105. After his death, his body was displayed in the main lobby of New York City Hall. An estimated 925,000 people paid their respects. He is interred in the Mount of Victory, Cypress Hills National Cemetery, Brooklyn, New York.

See also
Last surviving United States war veterans

References

External links 

Hiram Cronk
Article written by the Utica Sunday Journal to Celebrate the Veteran's 103rd birthday

Media
Film clip of the hearse procession for Hiram Cronk (including the carriage for NYC Mayor McClellan) on its way from Grand Central Station to New York City Hall, taken May 17, 1905.

1800 births
1905 deaths
Burials at Cypress Hills National Cemetery
People from Frankfort, New York
United States Army soldiers
People from New York (state) in the War of 1812
American centenarians
Men centenarians
Shoemakers
Articles containing video clips